Raymond Hanson may refer to:

*Raymond Alvah Hanson (1923–2009), American entrepreneur, inventor and engineer
Raymond Hanson (composer)  (1913–1976), Australian composer and lecturer
Raymond Hanson (cricketer) (born 1951), English cricketer
Ray Hanson (1895–1982), American football coach
Raymond Hansen (footballer)